G. Barrett Rich (August 11, 1875August 18, 1961) was the inspiration behind the G. Barrett Rich Mansion and winner of the Silver Buffalo Award – the highest commendation from the Boy Scouts of America. 

He was a businessman who held numerous executive roles including: 

 president of the Bank of Attica (later known as The Buffalo Commercial Bank), 
 an incorporator and director of the Commonwealth Trust Company 
 a trustee of the Erie County Savings Bank;
 Buffalo Public Library executive committee member; 
 YMCA life member; 
 North Presbyterian Church trustee; 
 Buffalo Club President;
 a member of the Buffalo Historical Society Board of Managers. 

Barrett was also national executive board member of Boys Life, Camp Chief of the World Jamboree and head of the Buffalo Jamboree. He was a first lieutenant on the brigade staff of the National Guard of the State of New York in 1871 

From 1883 to 1886, he held the role of high office of Paymaster-General of the State on the staff of Governor Grover Cleveland.

In 1910, he helped organize the Buffalo Council of the Boy Scouts.

References

Boy Scouts of America
People from Buffalo, New York
1875 births
1961 deaths